Fidel Castro (1926–2016) was a communist revolutionary leader of Cuba.

Fidel Castro may also refer to:

People
 Fidel de Castro (1911–2007), Filipino actor

Other uses
 My Life: A Spoken Autobiography (Spanish: Fidel Castro: Biografía a dos Voces), a Spanish language biography published as "Fidel Castro"
 Fidel Castro Secondary School, Tanzania
 List of things named after Fidel Castro, listing many things named "Fidel Castro"

See also
 Fidel Castro Smith (born 1963), British boxer
 Fidel (disambiguation)
 Castro (disambiguation)